Twenty-five feature films have been released based on the manga and anime series , known as Case Closed in North America. The first seven were directed by Kenji Kodama, films eight to fourteen were directed by Yasuichiro Yamamoto, films fifteen to twenty-one were directed by Kobun Shizuno, film twenty-two were directed by Yuzuru Tachikawa, films twenty-three and twenty-four were directed by Chika Nagaoka, and film twenty-five was directed by Susumu Mitsunaka. The films have been released in April of each year starting in 1997, excluding 2020. Each film features an original plotline rather than being an adaptation of the manga's story. Two film comics were released for each film. Funimation Entertainment released an English dubbed version of the first six films retaining the same name and story changes as its main Case Closed dub. Bang Zoom! Entertainment has begun to release English dubs of Case Closed films through Discotek Media, starting with the Episode One TV special.

Film series

The Time Bombed Skyscraper

It was partly based on Gosho Aoyama's planned ending for his previous series, Magic Kaito. In the movie, a chain of bombing cases occur around Tokyo and is related to Jimmy Kudo's past investigations. The Time Bombed Skyscraper was released in North America on Region 1 DVD by Funimation Entertainment on October 3, 2006.

The Fourteenth Target

The film follows Conan Edogawa as he attempts to stop a murderer killing people in an unknown order. The Fourteenth Target was released in North America on Region 1 DVD by Funimation Entertainment on November 20, 2007.

The Last Wizard of the Century

This movie follows Conan Edogawa as he attempts to thwart Phantom Thief Kid's plan to steal a newly discovered Faberge egg. The Last Wizard of the Century was released in North America on Region 1 DVD by Funimation Entertainment on December 15, 2009.

Captured in Her Eyes

Rachel Moore becomes entangled in a series of murder cases where police officers of a reopened case were victims; She was able to see the culprit but the trauma of witnessing an attempt at murder gave her amnesia and made herself a target of the killer. Captured in Her Eyes was released in North America on Region 1 DVD by Funimation Entertainment on December 29, 2009.

Countdown to Heaven

A Twin Tower is built and opened to the public while a murderer kills its employees one by one. At the same time, the Black Organization are searching for Shiho Miyano. Countdown to Heaven was released in North America on Region 1 DVD by Funimation Entertainment on January 19, 2010.

The Phantom of Baker Street

The story follows Conan Edogawa and several children as they are trapped in Noah's Ark, a virtual reality game where death will result if they lose the game. The Phantom of Baker Street was released in North America on Region 1 DVD by Funimation Entertainment on February 16, 2010.

Crossroad in the Ancient Capital

The seventh film, was released to Japanese theaters on April 19, 2003. The movie follows Conan and Hattori Heiji in Kyoto as they attempt to unmask antique robbers.

Magician of the Silver Sky

The eighth film, was released to Japanese theaters on April 17, 2004. The movie follows a poisoning case on an airliner where  both the pilot and co-pilot were also affected, Conan Edogawa and Phantom Thief Kid are forced to take control of the plane.

Strategy Above the Depths

The ninth film, was released to Japanese theaters on April 9, 2005. The movie is set on a cruise ship and integrates the murder of the shipbuilder and a shipwreck disaster.

The Private Eyes' Requiem

The tenth film, was released to Japanese theaters on April 15, 2006. The plot revolves around Conan Edogawa's investigation of an old murder case as his friends are held hostage in an amusement park.

Jolly Roger in the Deep Azure

The eleventh film, was released to Japanese theaters on April 21, 2007. The movie follows Conan Edogawa as he investigates the murder of two scuba divers searching for the alleged treasure left by pirate Anne Bonny on a Japanese island.

Full Score of Fear

The twelfth film, was released to Japanese theaters on April 19, 2008. The film follows Conan Edogawa as he attempts to discern the culprit targeting the lead singer for the grand opening of a new concert hall.

The Raven Chaser

The thirteenth film, was released to Japanese theaters on April 18, 2009. In the movie, a new member of the Black Organization, Irish, manages to find out Conan Edogawa's identity, putting everyone around him in danger.

The Lost Ship in the Sky

The fourteenth film, was released to Japanese theaters on April 17, 2010. In the film, Jirokichi Suzuki invites Conan Edogawa and his friends to ride the world's largest airship, but an unknown mysterious terrorist group hijacks the ship and releases a deadly virus.

Quarter of Silence

The fifteenth film, was released to Japanese theaters on April 16, 2011. In the film, Conan Edogawa and his friends go to a town near a recently constructed dam to enjoy snow, as well as to find the truth behind a bombing case.

The Eleventh Striker

The sixteenth film, was released to Japanese theaters on April 14, 2012. The story revolves around soccer and a timed bomb in the stadium.

Private Eye in the Distant Sea

The seventeenth film, was released to Japanese theaters on April 20, 2013. The story follows a case that occurs on an Aegis vessel.

Dimensional Sniper

The eighteenth film, was released to Japanese theaters on April 19, 2014. The story follows the FBI and Japanese Police as they try to stop a sniper causing chaos in Tokyō after killing a number of people.

Sunflowers of Inferno

The nineteenth film, was released to Japanese theaters on April 18, 2015. The movie revolves around the Kaito Kid's announcement of a heist, where he will steal Van Gogh's "Sunflowers" paintings. and Conan's attempts to discover the motives behind his sudden interest in the paintings, leading him to the possibility of an impostor posing as the Kaito Kid. Sunflowers of Inferno was released in the United States on Blu-ray by Discotek Media on January 25, 2022.

The Darkest Nightmare

The movie features Akai, Bourbon and, RUM. The Detective Boys and Professor Agasa meet a woman with amnesia, who regains her memory after seeing beaming colourful light, leading the Men In Black to them. The Darkest Nightmare was released in North America on Blu-ray by Discotek Media on September 28, 2021.

Crimson Love Letter

The case follows an incident in Kyoto, where Kazuha is entered into a card competition. Crimson Love Letter was released in North America on Blu-ray by Discotek Media on December 29, 2020.

Zero the Enforcer

Out of nowhere, an explosion occurs at Tokyo. The police force tries to find the culprit of this mess, and end up suspecting Mouri Kogoro. Conan finds out that Amuro was the one who framed Kogoro and that Amuro is working with the NPA (National Police Agency). Conan must prove Kogoro's innocence, figure out who the real culprit is, and find out what Amuro is up to. Zero the Enforcer was released in North America on Blu-ray by Discotek Media on September 29, 2020.

The Fist of Blue Sapphire

The twenty-third film, was released to Japanese theaters on April 12, 2019. The movie revolves around a Kaito Kid heist taking place in Singapore, the first time the primary setting is in another Asian country. The Fist of Blue Sapphire was released in North America on digital on March 16, 2021.

The Scarlet Bullet

The twenty-fourth film, was supposed to be released to Japanese theaters on April 17, 2020, but was postponed to April 16, 2021 due to the COVID-19 pandemic. The movie revolves around the Akai family as they and Conan investigate incidents that occur in Japan during the World Sports Games.

The Bride of Halloween

The twenty-fifth film, was released to Japanese theaters on April 15, 2022. The movie revolves around the incidents in Shibuya that gets Rei Furuya in danger, along with the reappearance of a disguised bomber named "Pramya", who he encountered with his now deceased classmates from the police academy three years ago.

Black Iron Submarine

The twenty-sixth film, is scheduled to release on April 14, 2023 in Japan. The movie revolves around the new Interpol marine facility "Pacific Buoy", where a female engineer is kidnapped by the Black Organization, seeking for some information in her USB drive. Meanwhile, Conan is concerned that Haibara's identity might have been exposed during the incident.

Spin-off films

Lupin the 3rd vs. Detective Conan: The Movie

 was released to Japanese theaters on December 7, 2013. The plot follows Conan, who sets out to apprehend Arsène Lupin III, the suspect behind the theft of a jewel called the Cherry Sapphire. It is a sequel to the 2009 television special Lupin the 3rd vs. Detective Conan.

Specials
The Disappearance of Conan Edogawa: His History's Worst Two Days, a television special which aired in Japan during 2014, was released as a theatrical film in South Korea on 12 February 2015.

It was released in North America on Blu-ray by Discotek Media on July 28, 2020.

It was released as a theatrical film with a three-week limited run in Japan from February 11 to March 4, 2021, before the release of Detective Conan: The Scarlet Bullet. The film was also released in Indonesia, Hongkong and Taiwan. In Vietnam, Detective Conan: The Scarlet Alibi was released to Japanese theaters online on YouTube by POPS in a limited one and a half month.

Box office performance

References
General
 

Specific

External links
 Official Detective Conan Movies Site 

Film series introduced in 1997

Lists of anime films
Anime film series
Lists of films by franchise
Lists of films based on manga